We Are Love is the second studio album by Italian operatic pop trio Il Volo, released by Geffen Records in November 2012.

It was released in Spanish speaking countries as Más Que Amor.

Track listing

Charts

Weekly charts

Year-end charts

Certifications

References

2012 albums
Geffen Records albums
Albums produced by Humberto Gatica
Il Volo albums